Federico Castelluccio (born April 29, 1964) is an Italian-American actor. He is best known for his role as Furio Giunta on the HBO series The Sopranos.

Early life
Born in Naples, Italy, Castelluccio moved with his family to Paterson, New Jersey, when he was three years old. In 1982, Castelluccio was awarded a full scholarship to the School of Visual Arts in New York City, where he earned a BFA in painting and media arts. Prior to winning the scholarship, he received an opportunity to create a painting for actor George Burns.

Career
Castelluccio began his career as an actor in 1986. Some of his film credits include Made with Jon Favreau, Fire with Paul Campbell and 18 Shades of Dust with Danny Aiello. In television, his credits include NYPD Blue and his best known role, in the HBO hit series The Sopranos, as the Neapolitan enforcer Furio Giunta.

He also appeared in A Guide to Recognizing Your Saints which debuted in 2006 at the Sundance Film Festival and received two awards, one for best dramatic directing and another for best dramatic ensemble, headed by Robert Downey Jr., Chazz Palminteri, and Rosario Dawson.

Other film projects include the biographical El Cantante; Aftermath, a crime thriller; and The Obscure Brother, filmed in southern Italy, a short film that he executive produced and acted in; 2003's La Araña; the 2008 comedy Capers; Lucky Days; and the 2009 Forget Me Not. In television, Castelluccio played the lead role in Dragon Dynasty, a telefilm that aired on the Sci-Fi Channel. He also appeared in the episode of Kenny Vs. Spenny titled "Who Can Produce The Best Commercial".

In 2014, Castelluccio starred in the short film Eulogy directed by Don Capria. The film won "Best Ensemble" in the 2015 Queens World Film Festival.

In 2016, Castelluccio directed the feature film The Brooklyn Banker. In 2017, Castelluccio directed the TV pilot Outcall.

During the fourth season of Celebrity Apprentice, Castelluccio was asked by Donald Trump to judge which celebrity designed the best hat. Castelluccio eventually chose La Toya Jackson. She was awarded $25,000 for her charity, the AIDS Project Los Angeles.

Painting discovery 

Castelluccio discovered a 17th-century painting by Italian baroque painter Guercino at a Frankfurt gallery and subsequently purchased it at auction in 2014 after it had been incorrectly identified as an 18th-century painting. He purchased the painting for approximately $68,000. After restoration, insurance, shipping, and other expenses, his total costs came to $140,000. The work's actual value was subsequently placed at approximately $10 million.

Filmography

Films
 1999 18 Shades of Dust – Bouncer #1
 2001 Made – Doorman
 2002 Fire – Himself (video)
 2003 La Arana – Bobby
 2004 Return of Fire – Himself (voice)
 2004 Volare – Paolo Bongiovanni (short film)
 2005 In Hot Water – Father Sal Manella (short film)
 2006 A Guide to Recognizing Your Saints – Antonio's Father
 2006 Dragon Dynasty – Marco TV Movie
 2006 El cantante – Jerry Massucci
 2007 The Obscure Brother – Father (short film)
 2008 Lucky Day – Vincent
 2008 Proud Iza – Samuel Stein
 2008 The Bronx Balletomane – Joey (short film)
 2008 The Brooklyn Heist – R. Fadagucci
 2008 Speak Now or Forever Hold Your Peace – Louie the Bartender
 2009 Forget Me Not – Samaratian Antagonist (short film)
 2010 Bicycle Lessons – Himself (voice) (short film)
 2010 Lily of the Feast – Santo Bastucci (short film)
 2010 For Customers Only – Mr. Sierra (short film)
 2011 Keep Your Enemies Closer – Agent (short film)
 2011 The Decoy Bride – Marco
 2011 The Orphan Killer – Dr. Morris (Uncredited)
 2012 The Trouble with Cali – Chassidic Bouncer
 2012 Pollination – Father short film
 2012 1,000 Times More Brutal – Kastriot Morina
 2012 Delivering the Goods – Enzo
 2013 Stanley's Adventures (short film)
 2013 Aftermath – Darrell
 2013 Checkmate: Keep Your Enemies Closer – Agent Lepari
 2013 House of Shadows – Nicola
 2014 Euology – Martin (short film)
 2015 Dutch Book – Mel
 2015 Fall 4 You – Nicky (short film)
 2016 Fall 4 You – Jerry
 2016 The Brooklyn Banker – Zucci
 2016 Leaves of the Tree – Doctor Ferramanti
 2016 Toy Gun – Sante Cassoria
 2017 Good Friday – Gio
 2018 Sarah Q – Barry Homburg
 2018 Exit 0 – Detective Mueller

TV shows
 1991–1996 Another World – Maltese Guard; 4 episodes
 2000–2002 The Sopranos – Furio Giunta; 28 episodes
 2003 NYPD Blue – Brian Vaughn; 1 episode
 2008 Law & Order: Criminal Intent – Frank Chess; 1 episode

Music videos
Rockstar by Nickelback

References

External links

 
Federico Castelluccio official site (archived version, now links to a domain-parking list)
Federico Castelluccio paintings

American male television actors
Male actors from New Jersey
Male actors from New York City
Living people
Actors from Paterson, New Jersey
School of Visual Arts alumni
20th-century American male actors
21st-century American male actors
1964 births
Italian emigrants to the United States
American art collectors
American people of Italian descent